The Edmund Ruffin Plantation, also known as Marlbourne, is a U.S. National Historic Landmark in Hanover County, Virginia,  northeast of Richmond.

History
Built in 1840, the plantation was purchased in 1843 by Edmund Ruffin, a Virginia planter and a pioneer in agricultural improvements; he also published an agricultural journal in the 1840s named the Farmer's Register. One of a group of intellectuals they called "the sacred circle", he worked to reform agriculture in the South, promoting crop rotation and soil conservation; he is considered to have been "the father of soil science" in the United States. Ruffin experimented with agricultural methods and mixed marl, defined as "a friable earthy deposit consisting of clay and calcium carbonate, used esp. as a fertilizer for soils deficient in lime" to add to soils.

He and his friends: James Henry Hammond, Nathaniel Beverley Tucker, George Frederick Holmes, and William Gilmore Simms, were pro-slavery and promoted a moral reform of the South. They published numerous articles in literary and short-lived magazines, promoting a stewardship role for masters to improve conditions under slavery.

Later Ruffin gained more attention as one of a number of secessionist fire-eaters; he traveled to South Carolina and is credited with firing one of the first shots at Fort Sumter in 1861.  Despondent after General Lee's surrender in 1865, he left a note proclaiming his "unmitigated hatred to Yankee rule—to all political, social and business connections with Yankees, & to the perfidious, malignant, & vile Yankee race" and committed suicide at Redmoor in Amelia County. He is buried on the grounds of Marlbourne.

His Marlbourne plantation was declared a National Historic Landmark in 1964.

See also
List of National Historic Landmarks in Virginia
National Register of Historic Places listings in Hanover County, Virginia

References

External links
Photo at Virginia DHR
Diary records of Ruffin's son, Edmund Ruffin, Jr., survive and describe events at this and other Ruffin plantations: Records of Ante-Bellum Southern Plantations From the Revolution Through the Civil War
Marl defined at www.dictionary.com
Edmund Ruffin at another encyclopedia, mentioning his use of marl

1823 establishments in Virginia
Georgian architecture in Virginia
Greek Revival houses in Virginia
Historic districts on the National Register of Historic Places in Virginia
Houses completed in 1843
Houses in Hanover County, Virginia
Houses on the National Register of Historic Places in Virginia
National Historic Landmarks in Virginia
National Register of Historic Places in Hanover County, Virginia
Plantations in Virginia